Franco Fantasia (5 March 1924 – 10 November 2002) was an Italian film actor, stuntman and fencing master. He appeared in more than one hundred films from 1951 to 2002. He was the brother of actor Andrea Fantasia.

Illness and Death
September 29, 2002 Fantasia announced he had been diagnosed with Lung Cancer
Fantasia passed away of a Heart Attack on November 10, 2002 at Rome, Italy at the age of 78

Filmography

References

External links
 

1924 births
2002 deaths
People from Rhodes
Italian male film actors
Greek people of Italian descent